The Antonivka Road Bridge, also known as the Antonivskyi Bridge, was a box girder bridge that crossed the Dnieper river in Kherson, Kherson Oblast, southern Ukraine.

Design and construction 
The bridge had been planned since 1977. It opened on 24 December 1985. It was located in the town of Antonivka, Kherson Raion, Kherson Oblast and connected Kherson to Oleshky and Hola Prystan via Highway M14.

2022 Russian invasion of Ukraine

Invasion
The bridge changed hands several times during the Battle of Kherson in February 2022 in an attempt by Russian forces to establish a path from Russian-held Crimea into central Ukraine. Ukrainian forces eventually lost control over the area on 26 February 2022 after fierce fighting, leaving several dead soldiers and destroyed military vehicles lying on the bridge.

Vulnerability
In a daily intelligence report by the British Ministry of Defence from mid-July 2022, the bridge was described as a "key vulnerability for Russian forces". Observers considered it to be the most important crossing to the Russian-controlled areas west of the Dnieper river, the only other one being in the vicinity of the Kakhovka Hydroelectric Power Plant.

Attacks
On 19 July, the bridge was damaged by Ukrainian rocket fire, allegedly using HIMARS rockets supplied by the United States. Ukrainian forces struck the bridge for the second day in a row on 20 July. Russian forces struggled to repair the bridge and temporarily closed it to cargo traffic. The two strikes on the bridge, as well as remarks by Russian Foreign Minister Sergey Lavrov to the effect that the territorial gains in the Kherson region would be consolidated as the result of the use of wider-range weaponsto which class HIMARS belongsby Ukraine, were seen by observers as indicating that the region could become one of the focal points of fighting.

On 26 July 2022 at approximately 22:55, the bridge sustained heavy damage following Ukrainian rocket fire using HIMARS, leading to the bridge being closed to passenger traffic. Some observers considered this third attack to be part of the counteroffensive announced earlier by Ukraine, which aimed to recapture the Kherson region. TASS reported that the Russian air defence systems had intercepted the projectiles, but this was disputed by the Ukrainian forces and does not match visual evidence. Later reports and video footage from 27 July show that the roadway surface on the bridge has been damaged; the surface is unusable for transit of heavy machinery.

By 23 August, repairs to the bridge had been completed and was once again in use by Russian forces. On 25 August, satellite images showed no fewer than 16 damage holes on the southern end of the bridge with vehicle traffic queuing on both sides as a temporary ferry services provided a crossing route across the Dnieper. A pontoon bridge was constructed by Russian forces on the eastern side of the bridge and was 60% completed as of 25 August.  

The crossing was struck again on 29 August amid reports of a Ukrainian counteroffensive, and strikes continued on the bridge and crossing throughout the closing days of August. By early September, Russian authorities said the bridge would be impassable for cars for weeks.

Withdrawal
By 11 November, with Ukrainian forces entering Kherson and Russian forces leaving it, part of bridge collapsed; according to the prominent Russian military blogger Rybar, the Russians destroyed it. An adjacent pontoon bridge was used by Russian forces during their withdrawal from Kherson.

References 

Bridges completed in 1985
Bridges over the Dnieper
Box girder bridges
Buildings and structures in Kherson Oblast
Concrete girder bridges
Kherson
Road bridges in Ukraine